"Dancin' Cowboys" is a song written by David Bellamy, and recorded by American country music duo The Bellamy Brothers.  It was released in May 1980 as the second single from the album  You Can Get Crazy.  The song was The Bellamy Brothers third number one on the country chart.  The single stayed at number one for one week and spent a total of fourteen weeks on the country chart.

Chart performance

Year-end charts

References

Songs about cowboys and cowgirls
Songs about dancing
1980 singles
The Bellamy Brothers songs
Warner Records singles
Curb Records singles
Songs written by David Bellamy (singer)
1980 songs